The Big Romance is the second album by Irish Singer-songwriter David Kitt. It was  released on June 18, 2001.

It was voted by Hot Press magazine to be the 31st best Irish album ever.

Track listing

"Song from Hope St. [Brooklyn NY]" - 5:20
"You Know What I Want to Know" - 3:51
"Step Outside in the Morning Light" - 5:28
"Private Dance" - 2:35
"Pale Blue Light" - 5:33
"What I Ask" - 7:54
"Strange Light in the Evening" - 5:54
"Whispers Return the Sun, Rest the Moon" - 6:11
"You and the City" - 6:43
"Into the Breeze" - 5:39

References

2006 albums
Blanco y Negro Records albums
David Kitt albums